Stericta angusta is a species of snout moth. It is found in Japan., Stericta angusta are also known to have wingspans of 18-20mm in length. Their head is covered in brownish orange scales.

References

Moths described in 1988
Epipaschiinae
Moths of Japan